General Paz may refer to

 The Argentine military leader José María Paz
 The Avenida General Paz avenue of Buenos Aires
 The General Paz Partido from the province of Buenos Aires
 The General Paz Department from the province of Corrientes
 The football team General Paz Juniors